"Je suis un homme" is a 2007 pop song recorded by French singer Zazie. It was the second single from her sixth studio album Totem and was released in early October 2007. It was the singer's most successful solo single, being a top-ten hit in France and Belgium (Wallonia).

Lyrics and music video
Written and composed by Zazie, alongside Philippe Paradis and Jean-Pierre Pilot, the song deals in a critical and pessimistic way with human behavior towards environmental issues and consumer society. On 17 April 2007, Zazie herself announced in the media that "Je suis un homme would be the second single off the Totem album. The music video was directed by Yvan Attal and the shooting was made at the Mac / Val, the Musée d'art contemporain of Vitry-sur-Seine. It shows the singer as a naked pregnant woman at an exhibition about the humanity. The woman is worried about various problems presented, including population explosion, forest devastated, deaths by malnutrition,  emissions... The song, as well as the music video, are available on Zazie's greatest hits compilation Zest of.

Chart performances and awards
In France, the single entered the SNEP chart on 6 October 2007 at a peak of seven, becoming Zazie's second top ten hit, after her duet with Axel Bauer, "À ma place". It then dropped slowly and remained for a total 22 weeks in the top 50 and 29 weeks in the top 100. In Belgium (Wallonia), it debuted at the bottom of the chart, and reached a peak of number seven, 16 weeks later. It remained in the top 40 for 28 weeks.

The song was nominated at the 2008 Victoires de la Musique in the category 'Original song of the year', but did not win.

Cover versions
The song was included in a medley named "medley double" and recorded by Gérard Darmon and Lorie for the 2007 album La Caravane des Enfoirés. "Je suis un homme" was performed live by Amandine Bourgeois and Ycare on 28 May 2008, in French television show Nouvelle Star. In 2010, Les Enfoirés recorded a cover of the song for their album La Crise de nerfs! ; the singers on this version are Pascal Obispo, Jean-Jacques Goldman, Claire Keim and Bénabar.

Track listings
 CD single

 CD single – Promo

 Digital download

Charts

Weekly charts

Year-end charts

References

2007 singles
Zazie songs
Songs written by Zazie
2007 songs
Mercury Records singles